Ocroeme is a genus of beetles in the family Cerambycidae, containing the following species:

 Ocroeme aspericollis Martins Chemsak & Linsley, 1966
 Ocroeme nana (Bates, 1870)
 Ocroeme recki (Melzer, 1931)
 Ocroeme tricolor Martins, 1980

References

Xystrocerini